The 2004–05 Sheffield Shield season known as the Pura Cup was the 103rd season of the Sheffield Shield, the domestic first-class cricket competition of Australia. New South Wales won the championship.

Table

Final

References

Sheffield Shield
Sheffield Shield
Sheffield Shield seasons